Shankar Nagar is a town in Tilottama Municipality in Rupandehi District in Lumbini Province of southern Nepal. The formerly village development committee was merged to form new municipality on 18 May 2014. At the time of the 1991 Nepal census it had a population of 9466 people living in 1694 individual households.

References

Populated places in Rupandehi District